Château de Ravignan is a château in Landes, Nouvelle-Aquitaine, France. It dates to 1663.

Châteaux in Landes (department)
Houses completed in 1663
1663 establishments in France